Ladomirov is a village and municipality in Snina District in the Prešov Region of north-eastern Slovakia.

History
Ladomirov was first mentioned in historical records in 1567.

Geography
The municipality lies at an altitude of 315 metres and covers an area of 15.245 km2. It has a population of about 350 people.

References

External links
 
 https://web.archive.org/web/20080111223415/http://www.statistics.sk/mosmis/eng/run.html

Villages and municipalities in Snina District